The 1968 Arizona gubernatorial election took place on November 5, 1968. Incumbent Governor Jack Williams ran for reelection to a second term as governor. Former Governor Samuel Pearson Goddard, who lost to Williams in 1966, again challenged Williams, losing to him in a repeat of the previous election cycle. Williams was sworn into his second term as governor on January 7, 1969.

Republican primary

Candidates
 Jack Williams, incumbent governor

Democratic primary

Candidates
 Samuel P. Goddard, former governor
 Currin V. Shields, director of the Institute of Government Research at the University of Arizona
 Jack DeVault

Results

General election

Results

References

1968
1968 United States gubernatorial elections
Gubernatorial
November 1968 events in the United States